The 1949–50 Copa del Generalísimo was the 48th staging of the Copa del Rey, the Spanish football cup competition.

The competition began on 27 November 1949 and concluded on 28 May 1950 with the final.

First round

|}

Replays 

|}
1 - Baracaldo won 3–1 on aggregate

Second round

|}

Replays 

|}
1 - Ferrol won 3–4 on aggregate

Third round

|}

Round of 16

|}

Quarter-finals 

|}

Semi-finals

|}

Final

|}

External links
 rsssf.com
 linguasport.com

Copa del Rey seasons
1949–50 in Spanish football cups